The School KFI  is situated in Chennai was started in the year 1973. It is run by the Krishnamurti Foundation India (KFI) based on the views on education and  philosophy of J. Krishnamurti. The school has about 350 students and 35 teachers.

Until May 2018, the school was located in a spacious campus in Adyar made available by The Theosophical Society. The School KFI relocated to a new campus in June 2018 to Thazhambur (on Old Mahabalipuram Road).

See also
 Jiddu Krishnamurti Schools
 Alternative School
 Krishnamurti Foundation
 Rishi Valley School
 Rajghat Besant School
 The Valley School

References

External links 
 The School KFI website

Schools in Chennai
Educational institutions established in 1973
1973 establishments in Tamil Nadu
Jiddu Krishnamurti schools